Susan Riley may refer to:

Susie Frances Harrison (1859–1935, née Susan Riley), Canadian poet, novelist and music composer
Susan Riley, character in Maniac Cop 2
Sue Riley, character in Taxi!